= Pestrikovo =

Pestrikovo may refer to:

- Pestrikovo, Moscow Oblast, a village (selo) in Moscow Oblast, Russia
- Pestrikovo, Tver Oblast, a village in Tver Oblast, Russia
